Oost-Cappel is a commune in the Nord department in northern France on the Belgian border.

Heraldry

See also
Communes of the Nord department

References

Oostcappel
French Flanders